The Enza is a river in northern Italy, a right tributary of the river Po. The Enza is the current boundary of the provinces of Parma and Reggio Emilia.

In its course in the Pianura Padana it becomes wider and flows into the Po near Brescello.

In ancient times it was known by its Latin name Incia.

References

Rivers of Italy
Rivers of Emilia-Romagna
Rivers of the Province of Reggio Emilia
Rivers of the Province of Parma